Bowerchalke Downs (also known as Woodminton, Marleycombe Down and Knowle Down), is a  biological Site of Special Scientific Interest in southern Wiltshire, England, notified in 1971.

The Bowerchalke Downs lie within the Cranborne Chase and West Wiltshire Downs Area of Outstanding Natural Beauty and are part of the Southern England Chalk Formation.

The English Nature citation from 1971 states that the site has an extensive area of floristically rich chalk grassland. Among the diverse plant species are sheep's-fescue Festuca ovina, meadow oat-grass Avenula pratensis, and dwarf sedge Carex humilis.

References 

Sites of Special Scientific Interest in Wiltshire
Sites of Special Scientific Interest notified in 1971
Hills of Wiltshire